The 43rd Airborne Regiment is light Airborne infantry regiment of the Commando type of the Czech Army based in Chrudim. It is the Czech Army third and youngest main ground fighting unit for defence of Czech Republic and for EU and NATO alliance forces. It was activated on 1 October 2020 from its direct predecessor, the 43rd Airborne Battalion of the 4th Rapid Deployent Brigade.

History

71st Parashute Battalion 
43rd Regiment traces its roots to the Infantry Battalion 71 (Parashute) that was formed on 1 October 1947 at Zákupy u České Lípy as a first parashute unit in the peacetime Czechoslovak Army after WWII. Two years later it was renamed to Parashute Battalion 71 "Československých parašutistů" to honor Czechoslovak paratroopers both from west and east that served during the Woold War II. Until 1950 the battalion main tasks were small team operations, diversions and sabotages. It was hoeever changed to align with soviet doctrine after that year.

The 71st Parashute Battalion later formed together with two other airborne battalions (72nd and 65th) the 22nd Parashute Brigade in Prešov. In 1960 the brigade was transferred to Prostějov. After the Holešov incident when the soldiers of the 7th Parashute Regiment os special eployment did not alloved Soviet units to its barracks on 21 August 1968 brigade was reorganized to regiment and the 71st Parashute Bttalion was disbanded in 1969.

On 1 October 1987 the 71st was reactivated at Chrudim barracks as a strike parashute battalion under direct command of the Western Military District in Tábor On 6 May 1989, the battalion received the battle flag and honorary title "národního hrdiny Jana Švermy".

43rd Airborne Battalion 
In 1991 it was renamed again to 71st Rapid Deployment Battalion and received its old name "Československých parašutistů". The size was increased to fill all positions on the subordinate units and when it was decided to form 4th Rapid Deployment Brigade the battalion was transferred to Ispectorate of Land Forces of General Staff of Czech Army and reorganised and renamed to 43rd Mechanized Airborne Infantry Battalion.

The Battalion became fully professional in 2000. In 2005 it received its new battle flag from president Václav Klaus. As the deployment and tasks of the battalion changed the mehanized from its name was dropped in 2014.

As a result of the 2014 NATO Wales summit it was decided that Czech Army will form third ground combat unit. The 43rd Battalion was chosen to be transformed to Regiment and fulfill the role of national immediate reaction force.

On symbolic date for the unit, 1 October 2020, the 43rd Airborne Regiment was formally activated. Former commander of the 43rd Battalion, Colonel Róbert Dziak became the first commander of the Regiment.

Structure
43rd Airborne Regiment uses unique structure based on "Commando" units that are stronger than old airborne company but smaller than battalion and sevral centers for support units. When fully staffed in 2026 it will consist of 1300 soldiers. The following elements are part of the regiment in 2023.
Headquarters and regiment staff
1st Commando
2nd Commando
3rd Commando
4th Commando
5th Commando of Active Reserves
Weapons Center
Combat Support Center
Logistical Center
Command Security Center
Parashute Training Center
Combat Training Center
Medical Detachment

References

Military units and formations of the Czech Republic
Group sized units of armies (land forces)
Military units and formations established in 2020